Elections to Liverpool Town Council were held on Monday 2 November 1863. One third of the council seats were up for election, the term of office of each councillor being three years.

Seven of the sixteen wards were uncontested.

After the election, the composition of the council was:

Election result

Because seven of the sixteen seats were uncontested seats, these statistics should be taken in that context.

Ward results

* - Retiring Councillor seeking re-election

Abercromby

Castle Street

Everton

Exchange

Great George

Lime Street

North Toxteth

Pitt Street

Rodney Street

St. Anne Street

St. Paul's

St. Peter's

Scotland

South Toxteth

Vauxhall

West Derby

By-elections

No. 2, Scotland, 

Following the resignation of Alderman Sanuel Holme, Councillor Richard Sheil (Merchant, of Bankfield Road, West Derby, elected to Scotland ward on 1 November 1861) was elected as an alderman on Wednesday 11 May 1864.

See also

 Liverpool City Council
 Liverpool Town Council elections 1835 - 1879
 Liverpool City Council elections 1880–present
 Mayors and Lord Mayors of Liverpool 1207 to present
 History of local government in England

References

1863
1863 English local elections
November 1863 events
1860s in Liverpool